A series of ICC World Cricket League tournaments and the 2014 Cricket World Cup Qualifier were played between 2009 and 2014 which formed part of the Cricket World Cup qualification process for the 2015 Cricket World Cup. It was the second time the World Cricket League was used for World Cup qualification. Following the establishment of the various leagues during the preceding cycle, it was composed of eight divisions. In addition, a series of qualifying regional tournaments were played. The divisions were played in roughly consecutive order, with the lower divisions played first. The top two from each division gained promotion to the following, higher division, meaning that some teams played in more than one division during the tournament. The first tournament, in May 2009, was the 2009 ICC World Cricket League Division Seven in Guernsey.

Tournaments summary

Teams

Regional tournaments

2009–10

References 

 
2009-14